Metacanthocephalus is a genus of worms belonging to the family Rhadinorhynchidae.

The species of this genus are found in Antarctica.

Species:

Metacanthocephalus campbelli 
Metacanthocephalus dalmori 
Metacanthocephalus johnstoni 
Metacanthocephalus ovicephalus 
Metacanthocephalus pleuronichthydis 
Metacanthocephalus rennicki

References

Rhadinorhynchidae
Acanthocephala genera